Sinclair Mountain is a prominent  mountain summit located in the Boundary Ranges of the Coast Mountains, in the U.S. state of Alaska. The peak's name was established in 1920 by the U.S. Coast and Geodetic Survey to remember Cephas Hempstone Sinclair (1847–1920), hydrographic and geodetic engineer who had 47 years of field service with that agency. The mountain's name was officially adopted in 1920 by the U.S. Board on Geographic Names. The first ascent of this seldom climbed peak was made in mid-June 1973 by Jerry Buckley, Joe Greenough, and Craig Lingle.

Climate

Based on the Köppen climate classification, Sinclair Mountain has a subarctic climate with cold, snowy winters, and cool summers. Weather systems coming off the Gulf of Alaska are forced upwards by the Coast Mountains (orographic lift), causing heavy precipitation in the form of rainfall and snowfall. Temperatures can drop below −20 °C with wind chill factors below −30 °C. This climate supports glaciers on the north, south, and east sides of this mountain. The months May through July offer the most favorable weather for viewing or climbing Sinclair Mountain.

See also

List of mountain peaks of Alaska
Geography of Alaska

References

Gallery

External links
 Sinclair Mountain: weather forecast

Mountains of Alaska
Boundary Ranges
North American 2000 m summits